Under the Southern Cross is a 1927 New Zealand drama film set in New Zealand, directed and produced for Gaumont British by Gustav Pauli.

The film probably has no connection with the 1929 American film of the same name, directed by Lew Collins, and also set in New Zealand.

Plot
A young man in England is wrongly accused of a crime, so emigrates to New Zealand and works on a farm. He falls in love with Hazel, the joint owner of a nearby sheep station. She is also fancied by the station manager but rejects his advances. It transpires that the manager has committed the original crime in England; he is arrested and the young couple are happily united. The "false accusation" and "pioneer settler" plot is similar to The Te Kooti Trail.

Cast
An undated scenario describes the film as "A glimpse of station life - played by an amateur cast of New Zealanders".

References

New Zealand Film 1912-1996 by Helen Martin & Sam Edwards p39 (1997, Oxford University Press, Auckland) 

1927 films
British drama films
British silent feature films
New Zealand drama films
Films set in New Zealand
1927 drama films
Films shot in New Zealand
New Zealand silent films
1920s rediscovered films
1920s English-language films
1920s British films
Silent drama films